Maxim "Max" Grechkin (or Maksim, ; born 4 March 1996) is a professional footballer currently with Beitar Jerusalem. Born in Ukraine, he has represented Israel at youth level.

Career statistics

Club

Notes

References

1996 births
Living people
Israeli footballers
Liga Leumit players
Hapoel Nir Ramat HaSharon F.C. players
Beitar Tel Aviv Bat Yam F.C. players
Hapoel Hadera F.C. players
Beitar Jerusalem F.C. players
FC Zorya Luhansk players
Israeli Premier League players
Ukrainian Premier League players
Ukrainian emigrants to Israel
Footballers from Kyiv
Association football defenders
Israel youth international footballers
Israel under-21 international footballers
Israel international footballers